Chavenon is a commune in the Allier department in Auvergne in central France.

History
The former name is Ecclesia de Cavenone, the name of a monastery which was destroyed in the French Revolution.

Population

Transportation
 Gare de Chavenon

Government
The following table shows mayors of Chavenon.

Sights
Saint-Martin Church, which is a 12th-century building

Castle Montgeorges, which is a 16th-century building
Manor of Saint Hubertus, which is a 19th-century mansion and now a Russian orthodox monastery  with a park drawn by the landscape gardener François-Marie Treyve.

 Watermill of Veaux on the river Aumance (the last one on this French river). The Aumance is a tributary of the Cher. This mill is on the Cassini map.

Manor of Sceauve, which is a former fief.

Personalities
Born in Chavenon:
 Cécile Desliens (1853–1937), painter
 Marie Desliens (1856–1938), painter

See also
 Auvergne (province), the historical independent county and later French province
 Auvergne (région), the modern-day administrative région, larger than the historical province of Auvergne, as it includes other provinces as Bourbonnais which historically were not part of Auvergne.
Bourbonnais
Portal:France
Portal:European Union
Communes of the Allier department

References

External links

 Official site
 Versailles national school of landscape architecture

Communes of Allier
Allier communes articles needing translation from French Wikipedia